CIRB may refer to:

CIRB (AM), a defunct radio station in Lac-Etchemin, Quebec
Central Institute for Research on Buffaloes
Central Institutional Review Board for the National Cancer Institute of the National Institutes of Health; see Cancer prevention
Canada Industrial Relations Board

See also
 CIRBP, Cold-inducible RNA-binding protein